Total South Africa, headquartered in Rosebank, South Africa,

Management

Products and services
 Fuels
 Lubricants
 Agrochemicals
 Food grade lubricants
 Bitumen and bitumen emulsions
 Illuminating paraffin
 Aviation fuel
 Marine fuel

TotalEnergies
Oil and gas companies of South Africa
Companies based in Johannesburg
Johannesburg Region B